Polje is a settlement in the Municipality of Bohinj in the Upper Carniola region of Slovenia.

References

External links

Polje at Geopedia

Populated places in the Municipality of Bohinj